Starston was a railway station on the Waveney Valley Line in Norfolk, England. It was open for just ten years before low traffic usage caused its closure in 1866 nearly a century before the rest of the line. It is now a cottage.

See also
Waveney Valley Line

References

Disused railway stations in Norfolk
Former Great Eastern Railway stations
Railway stations in Great Britain opened in 1855
Railway stations in Great Britain closed in 1866